Ali Qandu (also Romanized as ‘Alī Qandū; also known as ‘Alī Qandū-ye ‘Olyā) is a village in Chaybasar-e Jonubi Rural District, in the Central District of Maku County, West Azerbaijan Province, Iran. At the 2006 census, its population was 179, in 31 families.

References 

Populated places in Maku County